William Ogden may refer to:

 William Augustine Ogden (1841–1897), American composer
 William B. Ogden (1805–1877), American politician and first mayor of Chicago
Bill Ogden, a character in the 1953 film Background

See also
Will Ogdon, American composer (Wilbur)
 Ogden (disambiguation)